Arabian Nights is a 1942 adventure film directed by John Rawlins and starring Jon Hall, Maria Montez, Sabu and Leif Erikson.  The film is derived from The Book of One Thousand and One Nights but owes more to the imagination of Universal Pictures than the original Arabian stories. Unlike other films in the genre (The Thief of Bagdad), it features no monsters or supernatural elements.

The film is one of series of "exotic" tales released by Universal Pictures during World War II. Others include Cobra Woman, Ali Baba and the Forty Thieves and White Savage. This is the first feature film that Universal made using the three-strip Technicolor film process, although producer Walter Wanger had worked on two earlier Technicolor films for other studios: The Trail of the Lonesome Pine at Paramount and Walter Wanger's Vogues of 1938 for United Artists.

Plot
The story starts at a harem in Persia, where the elderly overseer bids his young charges to read the story of Haroun al-Rashid (Hall) and his wife Sherazade (Montez), unfolding the film's plot in the process.

Sherazade, a dancer in a wandering circus owned by Ahmad (Billy Gilbert) – whose troupe also includes Sinbad the Sailor and Aladdin, who have seemingly fallen on hard times - had captured the attention of Kamar (Erickson), the brother of caliph Haroun al-Rashid. In his infatuation with her, and because of a prophecy which names her as the future queen, Kamar had attempted to seize the throne, but was captured and sentenced to slow death by exposure. As Haroun visits his brother, for whom he feels pity, Kamar's men storm the palace and free their leader; outnumbered, Haroun is forced to flee. He manages to get near the plaza where Sherazade's circus is performing and is spotted by the young acrobat Ali Ben Ali (Sabu), who finds out his identity and decides to hide him in the circus, confiding only in Sherazade (though he does not tell her about the fugitive's true identity). Upon awakening from the wounds he had received in his flight, Haroun beholds Sherazade and instantly falls in love with her.

Meanwhile, Kamar, thinking that Haroun is dead, assumes the throne of Baghdad, but to his chagrin Sherazade is not to be found, and he orders the captain of his guard (Turhan Bey) to find her. But then the scheming Grand Vizier Nadan (Edgar Barrier) approaches the captain with the order to make Sherazade 'disappear', and upon finding them the captain decides to sell the troupe into slavery. But due to a witness the captain is exposed, and in order to preserve his plans, Nadan first gets him to confess and then murders him.

Haroun, Sherazade, and the acrobats manage to escape the slave pens and flee to the border, where they are found by Kamar's army and taken to a tent city in the desert. Kamar proposes to Sherazade, but she has in the meantime fallen in love with Haroun. Also, Nadan recognizes the caliph and his affection for Sherazade, and he uses this knowledge to blackmail Sherazade into helping him in his scheme: in exchange for Haroun's freedom, she is to poison Kamar during the wedding ceremony, upon which Nadan would assume rulership for himself. In secret, however, he plans to have Haroun killed once he has crossed the border.

Upon learning of this insidious scheme, Ali confides in his fellow performers, and they rush to free Haroun; then Haroun decides to free Sherazade with the help of the acrobats, while Ali is to summon the troops still loyal to him. Haroun and the others are quickly captured, and Sherazade and the retainers learn of his true identity. Kamar engages his brother in a sword fight, while Ahmad and the acrobats set the tents on fire; the arrival of Ali and the caliph's army triggers a massive battle with Kamar's men.

Finally, as Kamar prepares to deliver the deathstroke to Haroun, Nadan shows his true allegiance by assassinating Kamar personally. But as he prepares to finish Haroun, Ahmad and Ali interfere, forcing him to flee. But a spear thrown into his back stops him, and he dies in a burning tent; Haroun, Sherazade, their friends and the loyal subjects celebrate victory.

Cast

 Jon Hall – Haroun-Al-Raschid
 Maria Montez – Sherazade 
 Sabu – Ali Ben Ali
 Leif Erikson – Kamar
 Billy Gilbert – Ahmad
 Edgar Barrier – Nadan
 Richard Lane – Corporal
 Turhan Bey – Captain of the Guard
 John Qualen – Aladdin
 Shemp Howard – Sinbad
 William 'Wee Willie' Davis – Valda
 Thomas Gomez – Hakim
 Jeni Le Gon – Dresser / Dancer's Maid
 Robert Greig – Eunuch
 Charles Coleman – Eunuch
 Emory Parnell – Harem Sentry

Production
Walter Wanger had just joined Universal for whom he had made Eagle Squadron. Looking for a follow up he noted the box office success of The Thief of Bagdad which starred Sabu, who was under contract to Universal. The studio announced they would make the film on 24 March 1942. Montez, Hall and Sabu were always meant to star.

John Rawlins was assigned to direct and filming started in June. Even before filming began Universal announced the trio of leads would appear in a follow up Cobra Woman. Shortly after that the studio said they would appear in another film White Savage.

The movie was the first shot in colour on the Universal lot in 12 years.

Parts of the film were shot in the Coral Pink Sand Dunes State Park in Utah.

Reception
Bosley Crowther of The New York Times panned Arabian Nights, complaining that it "bears just about as much resemblance to the body of stories generally known by that name as a pulpwood fiction resembles Hans Christian Andersen's fairy tales ... It is not the story of Sinbad, the fabulous sailor, nor of Aladdin and his lamp, nor does it contain a Magic Carpet nor even a Flying Horse. It is just a conventional fiction, dressed up in flashy costumes..." Variety liked the film better, calling it "a colorful and actionful entertainment in tune with present audience requirements ... script and direction keep things moving at consistently fast clip, with dialog crisp throughout." Harrison's Reports called it "an exciting, fast-moving extravaganza" though "hampered by a weak story." Film Daily wrote: "The film captures with tremendous success all the riotous color and excitement of Araby of the story books ... [Wanger] must have spent a fortune in costumes and sets and has dressed the whole production in a show of color that has never been equalled on the screen." David Lardner of The New Yorker called the film "muddled" and suggested that Hollywood had been experiencing difficulty finding new roles for Sabu ever since Elephant Boy.

Box office
The film was a commercial success and earned a profit of $1,851,921. It earned rentals of $1.7 million in 1943.

It was one of the most popular films in France in 1946 with admissions of 4,498,985.

Awards
Arabian Nights was nominated for four Academy Awards: Best Score, Best Cinematography, Best Sound Recording (Bernard B. Brown) and Best Art Direction (Alexander Golitzen, Jack Otterson, Russell A. Gausman and Ira S. Webb).

References

External links

 
 
Arabian Nights at Maria Montez Fan Page
Review of film at Variety

1942 films
1942 adventure films
American adventure films
Circus films
1940s English-language films
Films directed by John Rawlins
Films set in Baghdad
Universal Pictures films
Films based on One Thousand and One Nights
Films produced by Walter Wanger
Films shot in Utah
Films scored by Frank Skinner
1940s American films